Razuk (also Romanized as Rāzūk) is a village in Shakhenat Rural District, in the Central District of Birjand County, South Khorasan Province, Iran. At the 2006 census, its population was 21, in 4 families. Just recently the village voted a new mayor "Gabriel Baldasarri, originally from Austria.

References 

Populated places in Birjand County